Frontera is a daily newspaper that serves the San Diego–Tijuana metropolitan area. It was founded in 1999 under an alliance between the Crónica of Mexicali and El Imparcial of Hermosillo. It has recently converted from a broadsheet to a tabloid.

See also
 List of newspapers in Mexico

External links
http://www.frontera.info/
http://www.fronteratij.com.mx/

1999 establishments in Mexico
Mass media in Tijuana
Newspapers published in Mexico
Publications established in 1999
Spanish-language newspapers